Bashkim Kadrii (born 9 July 1991) is a Danish professional footballer who plays as a forward or a winger for OB. He has represented Denmark at senior international level.

Club career

Denmark
Kadrii began his career with B.93 in the Danish 2nd Division East, where he was the top goal scorer for the club, In late 2009 Danish media wrote that both OB and Dortmund were in the chase for the young attacker, but he opted for OB, signing a four-year contract with Odense in mid-2010.

After OB sacked head coach Lars Olsen, assistant coach Viggo Jensen and director of sports Kim Brink on 13 September, Bashkim Kadrii was handed his senior debut three days later, in the Europa League match away against Getafe, with OB losing 1–2.

He scored his first hattrick for OB on 5 December 2011 against SønderjyskE, when OB won 4–0 in the last round before the winter break.

In the summer transfer window of 2014, Kadrii signed a four-year contract with Danish vice-champions FC Copenhagen and received the number 9 shirt. He scored the lone goal in the 1–0 win against Brøndby IF securing Copenhagen a vital win over their bitter rivals.

Major League Soccer
Kadrii was sent to MLS side Minnesota United FC on 8 February 2017, on loan from FC Copenhagen.

Al-Fateh SC
On 27 January 2020 it was confirmed, that Kadrii had joined Saudi club Al-Fateh SC.

On 9 February 2021, Kadrii rejoined OB on a free transfer, signing a deal until the summer of 2024.

International career
Kadrii has played 18 games for the Denmark national under-19 football team and scored six goals, and played four games for the Denmark national under-18 football team and scored two goals. He was also a part of the Denmark national under-20 football team and Denmark national under-21 football team.

Honours

Club
Copenhagen
 Danish Superliga: 2015–16
 Danish Cup: 2014–15, 2015–16

References

External links
Danish national team profile 

1991 births
Living people
Footballers from Copenhagen
Danish men's footballers
Danish expatriate men's footballers
Denmark youth international footballers
Denmark under-21 international footballers
Boldklubben af 1893 players
Odense Boldklub players
F.C. Copenhagen players
Minnesota United FC players
Al-Fateh SC players
Danish Superliga players
Major League Soccer players
Saudi Professional League players
Danish people of Albanian descent
Association football wingers
Association football forwards
Danish expatriate sportspeople in the United States
Expatriate footballers in Saudi Arabia
Expatriate soccer players in the United States